Marcel Germain Perrier (16 May 1933 – 2 October 2017) was a Roman Catholic bishop.

Perrier was ordained to the priesthood in 1958. He was named auxiliary bishop of the Roman Catholic Archdiocese of Chambéry-Saint-Jean-Maurienne–Tarentaise, France in 1988. He then served as bishop of the Roman Catholic Diocese of Pamiers from 2000 until 2008. He retired on 24 June 2008, and died on 2 October 2017 at the age of 84.

See also
Catholic Church in France

Notes

1933 births
2017 deaths
Bishops of Pamiers
21st-century Roman Catholic bishops in France
20th-century Roman Catholic bishops in France